Jardim São Paulo–Ayrton Senna, originally known only as Jardim São Paulo, is a metro station on São Paulo Metro Line 1-Blue, located in the district of Santana, in São Paulo. It was opened by Governor Mário Covas on 29 April 1998, along with stations Tucuruvi and Parada Inglesa, in the Line 1 north expansion project, initiated in 1996.

Characteristics

It is a buried station with an apparent concrete structure and island platform located under the distribution mezzanine. It has openings for natural lighting in the ambient of the platform and a different landscaping project, with the presence of gardens on the level of the lobby, where the tickets offices and the gates are. The project of the station gave to the architect Meire Gonçalves Selli an award in the 2nd Iberoamerican Architecture and Civile Engineering Biennal of Madrid in 2000.

It has  of constructed area and capacity of 20,000 passengers per hour during the peak hours.

It has two exits, both located inside Domingos Luís Park and has access for people with disabilities.

Renaming

In 2009, State Deputy Campos Machado (PTB), proposed a project for the renaming of the station from "Jardim São Paulo" to "Jardim São Paulo-Ayrton Senna". Senna, the legendary Formula 1 racing driver who was killed in a high-speed accident at the 1994 San Marino Grand Prix, was born and raised in the region of Jardim São Paulo. In 2011, the renaming was approved by the State Government, and such change was implemented since October of that year. The project counted with many supports from the population, including the collect of many signatures for a petition. A sculpture as a tribute for the pilot should be installed in the location. The sculpture will be made by the designer and plastic artist Paulo Soláriz, known by his sculpture-trophies and art aimed to motor racing and idealizer of the renaming project.

References

São Paulo Metro stations
Things named after Ayrton Senna
Railway stations located underground in Brazil